Chrysophtalmum is a genus of flowering plants belonging to the family Asteraceae.

Its native range is Turkey to Northern Iraq.

Species:

Chrysophtalmum dichotomum 
Chrysophtalmum gueneri 
Chrysophtalmum montanum

References

Asteraceae
Asteraceae genera